The 2005–06 Maltese First Division (known as 2005–06 BOV First Division for sponsorship reasons) started on 10 September 2005 and finished on 14 May 2006. Lija Athletic and St. Patrick were the teams which were relegated from the 2004–05 Maltese Premier League. Tarxien Rainbows and St.Andrews were the promoted teams. St. Georges were the champions and Marsa were the runners-up. Both were promoted to the Premier League. Lija Athletic and St. Andrews were relegated. This was two straight relegations for Lija while St. Andrews were sent back down having just been promoted.

Teams

The Maltese First Division 2005–06 was made up of these teams:
 Lija Athletic
 Marsa
 Mqabba
 Naxxar Lions
 San Ġwann
 Senglea Athletic
 St. Andrew's
 St. George's
 St. Patrick
 Tarxien Rainbows

Changes from previous season

 Ħamrun Spartans and Mosta were promoted from the First Division to the Premier League. They were replaced by Lija Athletic and St. Patrick, both relegated from the 2004–05 Maltese Premier League.
 Balzan Youths and Gozo were relegated to the 2005–06 Maltese Second Division. They were replaced by Tarxien Rainbows and St. Andrews.

League table

Results

Top scorers

References

Maltese First Division seasons
Malta
2